Antonino De Rosa is an Italian-American Magic: The Gathering player. His successes include four Grand Prix wins, a US Nationals title in 2005, and a top eight at Pro Tour Prague 2006.

Achievements

Other accomplishments

 Two appearances at Italian nationals.

References

Living people
American Magic: The Gathering players
1981 births